Bianca Druță (born 6 March 2001) is a Moldovan futsal player and a footballer who plays as a midfielder for Women's Championship club Agarista-ȘS Anenii Noi and the Moldova women's national team.

References

2001 births
Living people
Moldovan women's footballers
Women's association football midfielders
Moldova women's international footballers
Moldovan women's futsal players
Agarista-ȘS Anenii Noi players